was a Japanese actor and voice actor from Nagasaki.

Filmography

Anime
3000 Leagues in Search of Mother (Federico)
Alps no Shōjo Heidi (bakery owner)
Anime Sanjushi (Bonacieux)
Candy Candy (Garcia)
DNA² (Saburo Kurimoto)
Doraemon (role unspecified)
Famous Detective Holmes (role unspecified)
GeGeGe no Kitaro 1985 (Amajaku)
Genshi Shōnen Ryuu (Karimu)
Go! Go! Itsutsugo Land (store chairman)
Haikara-san ga Tōru (Ookouchi)
Heisei Tensai Bakabon (role unspecified)
Hime-chan no Ribon (Erika's father)
Hurricane Polymar (role unspecified)
Jungle Book Shōnen Mowgli (Bagheera)
Karasu Tengu Kabuto (Byakuryuu)
Karate Baka Ichidai (role unspecified)
Kashi no Ki Mokku (role unspecified)
Kerokko Demetan (role unspecified)
La Seine no Hoshi (Riyon)
Lupin III (Iwanofu)
Lupin III: Mystery of the Hemingway Papers (monk)
Mahōjin Guru Guru (Toma's father)
Maya the Bee (role unspecified)
Meiken Jolie (role unspecified)
Mīmu Iro Iro Yume no Tabi (role unspecified)
Mister Ajikko (Eikichi)
Mori no Tonto-tachi (role unspecified)
Oz no Mahōtsukai (role unspecified)
Perrine Monogatari (role unspecified)
Rascal the Raccoon (Federiko)
Romeo no Aoi Sora (Beppo)
Sabu to Ichi Torimono Hikae (Kurata)
Sazae-san (Nanbutsu Isasaka)
Science Ninja Team Gatchaman (role unspecified)
Serendipity the Pink Dragon (role unspecified)
Shinzō Ningen Casshern (role unspecified)
Space Oz no Bouken (minister, virtual president)
Space Battleship Yamato (Barreled Action, politician)
Uchū no Kishi Tekkaman Blade (role unspecified)
Uchuusen Sagittarius (role unspecified)
Umi no Triton (role unspecified)
Under Sea Boy Marine (role unspecified)
Wansa-kun (role unspecified)
Yume no Hoshi no Button Nose (role unspecified)

OVAs
Ariel (Prof. Amamoto)
Gude Crest (Elder Gluk)
Kabuto (Hakuryuu)
Key the Metal Idol (Prince of Snake-Eyes)
Haou Taikei Ryū Knight: Adeu's Legend (Slayer priest)
SD Gundam Gaiden (King Konskon)
Yōtōden (Ryoan)

Films
Laputa: Castle in the Sky (various minor roles)
Farewell Space Battleship Yamato (politician)
Lupin III: Legend of the Gold of Babylon (elder)
The Castle of Cagliostro (Archbishop's Driver / Riot Squad Member / Drunk Tourist (voice))
Nagagutsu Sanjyuushi (chubby lady)
Panda! Go, Panda!: Rainy Day Circus (role unspecified)
Yōtōden: Wrath of the Ninja (Ryoan)

Tokusatsu
Kamen Rider, (Bat Man (Ep 2), Mogurang (Ep 28), Cockroach Man (Ep 55), Garagaranda (Ep 79))
Kamen Rider, films (Garagaranda, Spider Man, Inokabuton, Roach Man, Mogurang, Dokumondo, Earthworm Man, Semiminga, Armadilong, Golden Wolf Man)
Kamen Rider V3, (Turtle Bazooka (Ep 1-2), Hammer Jellyfish (Ep 5-6), Magnet Boar (Ep 13), Mantis Boomerang (Ep 25), Vampiric Mammoth (Ep 35))
Kamen Rider X: Five Riders vs. King Dark (Genghis Khan-Condor, Altas)
Kamen Rider Amazon (Crab Beastman (Ep 9), Beastman Dobsonfly (Ep 13-14))
Skyrider, (Arijigokujin (Ep 13), Kurageron (Ep 20-21))
New Kamen Rider: Eight Riders vs. Galaxy King (Armadig)
Kamen Rider Super-1, (Bakuronger (Ep 10), Sprayder (Ep 31), Shabonurun (Ep 40))
Gekisou Sentai Carranger, (HH Wasshoishoi (Ep 28))

Dubbing

Live-action
12 Angry Men (Juror #1 (Martin Balsam))
Bob Roberts (Senator Brickley Paiste (Gore Vidal))
Diabolique (Leo Katzman (Allen Garfield))
Dudley Do-Right (Inspector Fenwick (Robert Prosky))
I Love Trouble (Matt Greenfield (Robert Loggia))
Jacob's Ladder (1993 NTV edition) (Mr. Geary (Jason Alexander))
Lara Croft: Tomb Raider (Wilson (Leslie Phillips))
Malèna (Bonsignore)
Miracles (Tung (Bill Tung))
Nineteen Eighty-Four (Parsons (Gregor Fisher))
Police Story 3: Super Cop ("Uncle" Bill Wong (Bill Tung))
Rumble in the Bronx (Uncle Bill Ma (Bill Tung))
She-Wolf of London (Mr. Oates (Roger Winslet))
Sonny & Jed (1979 TV Tokyo edition) (Aparacito (Franco Giacobini))
Murphy Brown (John)
Ultraman: The Ultimate Hero (Harikki)

Animation
Who Framed Roger Rabbit (Benny the Cab)
Chip 'n Dale Rescue Rangers (Monterey Jack)

Other Voice-Overs
Roger Rabbit's Car Toon Spin (Benny the Cab)
Peter Pan's Flight (Pirates Bert)

References

External links
 
 

1935 births
2002 deaths
Japanese male voice actors
Male voice actors from Nagasaki Prefecture